Hammonsville is an unincorporated community in Hart County, Kentucky, in the United States.

History
Hammonsville was named for an early resident.

References

Unincorporated communities in Kentucky
Hart County, Kentucky